Isometrus garyi is a species of scorpion in the family Buthidae. It is endemic to Sri Lanka. It is not known fatal to humans.

References

Academis.edu

Animals described in 2002
Scorpions of Asia
Endemic fauna of Sri Lanka
garyi